The Oak Grove Hydroelectric Project is a 44 megawatt hydroelectric plant operated by Portland General Electric (PGE) on the Oak Grove Fork Clackamas River. Water for this project is held by three lakes, built between 1923 and 1956.  The dam creates the impoundment Lake Harriet.

History 
In 1907, the Southern Pacific Company began to acquire water rights for the Oak Grove fork. These rights were transferred in 1911 to the Portland Railway, Light and Power Company, which later became PGE.

In 1923, the concrete diversion dam at Lake Harriet was completed. A  pipeline goes downstream from Lake Harriet to the powerhouse. Power generation from the Oak Grove fork began in August 1924.

The Oak Grove Powerhouse contains two Francis turbines.

References

External links 

 USGS flow data at Oak Grove powerplant intake
 DEQ survey 
 PGE: parks on the Clackamas River
 BPA: Oak Grove Habitat Improvement Project, 1988

Hydroelectric power plants in Oregon
Buildings and structures in Clackamas County, Oregon
Energy infrastructure completed in 1924
1924 establishments in Oregon
Portland General Electric dams